Glyndŵr House, Grosmont, Monmouthshire is a village house dating from the late 17th century. It is a Grade II* listed building.

History

The frontage of the house carries a date of 1742 but this may indicate the date of the house’s remodelling. but this indicates the date of the house's remodelling. Its origins are earlier, dating from the late 17th century. A door lintel in the kitchen is dated 1684. The mid-18th century alterations gave the house a "Renaissance" façade, with a forecourt and a decorative gate and railings of ironwork, which are included in the house's listing. The interior, and the garden frontage, were again remodelled in the 19th century, with the addition of a veranda.

Architecture and description
The architectural historian John Newman describes the house as "well-proportioned but formulaic." It has five bays and two storeys.

Notes

References 
 

Grade II* listed buildings in Monmouthshire
Country houses in Wales